Bring It On Again is a 2004 American cheerleading comedy film directed by Damon Santostefano and starring Anne Judson-Yager and Bree Turner.

This film is a sequel to Bring It On series, but there are no recurring cast members or canonical references to the previous film. Bring It On Again is also the only sequel of the four that followed Bring It On that shared the same producers.

Plot
Whittier arrives at the fictional California State College, hoping to join the national champion varsity cheerleading team. She meets up with her friend from cheer camp, Monica, and they both put on impressive performances at the tryouts. Head cheerleader Tina is ready to ask them to join the team, but fellow cheerleader Greg goes a step further, telling Tina that Whittier will be the next head cheerleader. This angers Tina's pal, Marni, who had the position staked out, but at the urging of Dean Sebastian, Tina goes along with the plan and takes Whittier under her wing.

Whittier meets Derek, a campus D.J. who immediately takes an interest in her. Tina is very demanding and domineering and warns Whittier that Derek is not the type of boy she should be dating. Monica is bothered by Tina's meddling, but Whittier momentarily lets her cheerleading ambition get the better of her, and betrays Derek. Tina upset's with Monica's sassy attitude, punishes her which leads to an injury and she forces Whittier to choose between her friendship and the squad. Whittier and Monica get fed up and quit Tina's tyranny, but Whittier's school spirit cannot be suppressed.

With Monica's help, she gathers up the outcasts from the drama club, the dance club, and other groups that have lost their funding because of the squad and forms a ragtag squad of her own, determined to battle the varsity squad for a spot at the national championship. The two teams end up competing for the spot at nationals, with Whittier's squad ultimately winning. Afterward, Whittier offers Tina a spot on her squad, a position that Tina initially refuses but ends up wanting. The film ends with Tina sucking up to Whittier and Monica, deciding she wants to be on their squad after all, while Marni throws a comical fit.

Cast

 Anne Judson-Yager as Whitter Smith
 Faune A. Chambers as Monica Washington
 Bree Turner as Tina Hermersmith
 Bethany Joy Lenz as Marni Potts
 Richard Lee Jackson as Derek 
 Bryce Johnson as Greg
 Felicia Day as Penelope Hope
 Dennis Hemphill Jr. as Francis 
 Holly Towne as Janice 
 Kevin Cooney as Principal Dean Sebastian
 Katherine Bailess as Colleen Lipman
 Chris Carmack as Todd
 Joshua Gomez as Sammy / team mascot
 Kelly Stables as Stinger teammate
 Brian Patrick Wade as Stinger teammate 
 Darren Geare as Stinger teammate
Jerry Trainor as Smug Guy

References

External links
 
 

2004 films
2000s sports comedy films
2000s teen comedy films
2004 direct-to-video films
American direct-to-video films
American sequel films
American sports comedy films
American teen comedy films
Beacon Pictures films
Bring It On (film series)
Cheerleading films
Direct-to-video comedy films
Direct-to-video sequel films
2000s English-language films
Films directed by Damon Santostefano
Films produced by Marc Abraham
Films scored by Paul Haslinger
Films shot in Los Angeles
Teen sports films
Universal Pictures direct-to-video films
2004 comedy films
Films set in California
2000s American films